Westkäslausch  was a Low Prussian dialect spoken in an area of Poland, that used to be part of Germany. The Preußisches Wörterbuch, a dictionary of dialects, includes Westkäslausch using this wording.

Geography 
Westkäslausch used to have borders to Breslausch, Natangian, Mundart des Kürzungsgebiets, and High Prussian.
Westkäslausch was spoken in an area having Pieniężno as a kind of midpoint. Westkäslausch does not have a border to Ostkäslausch.

Phonology 
It has d between vowels as r. Diphthongization seen in Natangian is mostly also present in Westkäslausch.

Grammar 
It has the preterite forms kam and nam.

References 

East Prussia
Low Prussian dialect
German dialects
Languages of Poland